Michèle Moretti (born 15 March 1940 in Paris, France) is a French actress. She has appeared in more than one hundred films since 1961.

Theater

Filmography

References

External links
 

Living people
French film actresses
French television actresses
Actresses from Paris
French stage actresses
1940 births
20th-century French actresses
21st-century French actresses
Signatories of the 1971 Manifesto of the 343